Allium oreophilum, the pink lily leek, is a plant species native to Xinjiang, Afghanistan, Kazakhstan, Kyrgyzstan, Pakistan, Tajikistan, Uzbekistan, Iran, Iraq, Turkmenistan, European Russia, Turkey, Azerbaijan, Armenia and Georgia.

The leaves are flat, narrow, longer than the scape. The umbel has 10–15 red flowers.

References

External links
photo of herbarium specimen at Missouri Botanical Garden, isotype of Allium oreophilum, collected from the Caucasus region

oreophilum
Flora of temperate Asia
Plants described in 1831
Flora of Pakistan